Isenburg-Covern was the name of a state of the Holy Roman Empire, based around Kobern-Gondorf in modern Rhineland-Palatinate, Germany. It was partitioned from Isenburg-Limburg-Covern in 1158. After the counts became extinct in 1306 it was annexed by Isenburg-Cleberg.

Counts of Isenburg-Covern

Counties of the Holy Roman Empire
House of Isenburg